Veaceslav Ioniță (born 4 October 1973) is an economist and politician from Moldova.

Life and career
Following attendance at the Strășeni general school, he graduated from the Academy of Economic Studies of Moldova (AESM). He is currently a lecturer in the Social Management Department of AESM and an expert on economic issues with the Institute for Development and Social Initiatives (IDIS Viitorul). He is also the author of numerous publications related to public administration, public finance, fiscal decentralization, etc. Veceslav Ioniță is an Associate Professor of economics and an expert on economic issues in Moldova. He has been a member of the Parliament of Moldova since 2009.

Works
 Managementul cunoștințelor, Chișinău 2005
 Ghidul primarului, Chișinău 2005
 Ghidul orașelor din republica Moldova, Chișinău 2004
 Regulatory Governance in SEE Countries: Progress and Challenges, OECD 2004
 Основы государственного администрирования, Chișinău 2001.
 Managementul administrației publice. Manual, A.S.E.M., Chișinău 1999.
 Studii de caz. Îndrumar metodic la disciplina "Bazele managementului". A.S.E.M., Chișinău 1998.

References

External links 
 Veaceslav Ioniţă | Pagină personală
 Parlamentul Republicii Moldova
 Partidul Liberal Democrat din Moldova
 Biografia lui Veaceslav Ioniţă
 Portofoliul lui Veaceslav Ioniţă

1973 births
Living people
People from Strășeni District
Moldovan economists
Liberal Democratic Party of Moldova MPs
Moldovan MPs 2009–2010